Encore is the second studio album by American singer-songwriter Sam Cooke, produced and arranged by Bumps Blackwell who conducts His Orchestra.

Track listing

Side one
 "Oh! Look at Me Now" (Joe Bushkin, John DeVries) – 2:51
 "Someday" (Johnny Hodges) – 2:14
 "Along the Navajo Trail" (Dick Charles, Eddie DeLange, Larry Markes) – 3:05
 "Running Wild" (Arthur Gibbs, Joe Grey, Leo Wood) – 1:25
 "Ac-Cent-Tchu-Ate the Positive" (Harold Arlen, Johnny Mercer) – 3:24
 "Mary, Mary Lou" (Cayet Mangiaracina) – 2:44

Side two
 "When I Fall in Love" (Albert Felden) – 2:41
 "I Cover the Waterfront" (Edward Heyman, Johnny Green) – 2:11
 "My Foolish Heart" (H. Martin, J. Ward, S. Brown) – 2:20
 "Today I Sing the Blues" (Cliff White, Curtis Lewis) – 3:20
 "The Gypsy" (Billy Reid) – 2:30
 "It's the Talk of the Town" (Al Neiburg, Jay Livingston, Marty Symes) – 3:08

When I Fall in Love / My Foolish Heart
Two errors appear in the credits of "When I Fall in Love". The composer is credited as Albert Felden, but it should be Albert Selden, co-producer of Man of La Mancha who in 1948 composed a song titled When I Fall in Love for the Broadway revue Small Wonder. But, in fact, Sam Cooke sings the 'other' song, the popular "When I Fall in Love" composed for the film One Minute to Zero by Victor Young with lyrics by Edward Heyman.

Victor Young had no luck in this album because "My Foolish Heart", also composed by him, in this case with lyrics by Ned Washington, for the 1949 film My Foolish Heart is credited to H. Martin, J. Ward and S. Brown. Victor Young, died in November 10, 1956, two years before the release of this album.

1958 albums
Sam Cooke albums
Albums produced by Robert Blackwell
Keen Records albums